Brett James (born 15 December 1972) is a former professional Australian rules footballer who played for the Collingwood Football Club and Adelaide Football Club in the Australian Football League (AFL).

In 2015, James was inducted into the South Australian Football Hall of Fame.

Early career
James joined Norwood from Kersbrook from the Hills Football League in 1990. In the 1992 AFL Draft Brett James was selected by Collingwood at pick 31, and would be joined by Norwood teammate Scott Burns who was selected at pick 90.

AFL career
James joined  in 1994, a year after he was drafted.

James was recruited by Adelaide to add depth to their list, often coming off the bench or playing back pocket. He played 17 games in his first season, including coming off the bench in the 1997 AFL Grand Final. After winning the grand final for Adelaide, James completed the unusual feat of winning two premierships within in a week as he was also a part of the Norwood team that won the 1997 SANFL flag. James then developed into a valuable player for Adelaide as he was a part of the 1998 premiership. In 1999, James played every game but only played 14 games in 2000 and he was delisted.

Playing statistics

|- style="background-color: #EAEAEA"
! scope="row" style="text-align:center" | 1994
|style="text-align:center;"|
| 8 || 17 || 15 || 6 || 43 || 57 || 100 || 19 || 24 || 0.9 || 0.4 || 2.5 || 3.4 || 5.9 || 1.1 || 1.4
|-
! scope="row" style="text-align:center" | 1995
|style="text-align:center;"|
| 8 || 15 || 9 || 7 || 82 || 99 || 181 || 17 || 25 || 0.6 || 0.5 || 5.5 || 6.6 || 12.1 || 1.1 || 1.7
|- style="background:#eaeaea;"
! scope="row" style="text-align:center" | 1996
|style="text-align:center;"|
| 8 || 10 || 2 || 2 || 40 || 82 || 122 || 23 || 20 || 0.2 || 0.2 || 4.0 || 8.2 || 12.2 || 2.3 || 2.0
|-
! scope="row" style="text-align:center;" | 1997
|style="text-align:center;"|
| 11 || 17 || 3 || 3 || 126 || 154 || 280 || 23 || 38 || 0.2 || 0.2 || 7.4 || 9.1 || 16.5 || 1.4 || 2.2
|- style="background:#eaeaea;"
! scope="row" style="text-align:center;" | 1998
|style="text-align:center;"|
| 11 || 23 || 15 || 8 || 191 || 228 || 419 || 55 || 42 || 0.7 || 0.3 || 8.3 || 9.9 || 18.2 || 2.4 || 1.8
|-
! scope="row" style="text-align:center" | 1999
|style="text-align:center;"|
| 11 || 22 || 2 || 10 || 181 || 210 || 391 || 57 || 20 || 0.1 || 0.5 || 8.2 || 9.5 || 17.8 || 2.6 || 0.9
|- style="background:#eaeaea;"
! scope="row" style="text-align:center" | 2000
|style="text-align:center;"|
| 11 || 14 || 6 || 2 || 79 || 118 || 197 || 37 || 11 || 0.4 || 0.1 || 5.6 || 8.4 || 14.1 || 2.6 || 0.8
|- class="sortbottom"
! colspan=3| Career
! 118
! 52
! 38
! 742
! 948
! 1690
! 231
! 180
! 0.4
! 0.3
! 6.3
! 8.0
! 14.3
! 2.0
! 1.5
|}

Post AFL
James continued playing with Norwood in 2002 and played there until 2006. Brett played a total of 234 games for Norwood from 1990-1993 and 1997-2006. James also kicked 62 goals, was captain from 2002 to 2006 and won the best and fairest 3 times. Nowadays he works on his Kersbrook farm with his brother Roger who also won the premiership in 1997 with Norwood alongside Brett and also with Port Adelaide in 2004. James also is captain coach of Kersbrook in the Hills Football League.

References

External links

1972 births
Living people
Australian rules footballers from South Australia
Adelaide Football Club players
Adelaide Football Club Premiership players
Collingwood Football Club players
Norwood Football Club players
South Australian State of Origin players
South Australian Football Hall of Fame inductees
Two-time VFL/AFL Premiership players